Mead is a Dispersed Rural Community and unincorporated place in geographic Lowther Township, Cochrane District in Northeastern Ontario, Canada. The community is counted as part of Unorganized Cochrane North Part in Canadian census data, and is located just north of the border with Algoma District.

Mead is also on the Algoma Central Railway between the communities of Horsey to the south and Coppell to the north; the latter community is also served by Ontario Highway 583.

Along with a few isolated farms, the only other building at Mead is a former forestry company: from 1973 to 1984, American lumber company, Newaygo Timber operated a mill here.

References

Other map sources:

Communities in Cochrane District